Undead Indeed is the first live DVD/2CD by Finnish heavy metal band Tarot. It was recorded in Rupla Club, Kuopio, Finland, on 17 August 2007. The DVD was released on 11 June 2008.

CD & DVD

Track listing (DVD) 
 Intro (Band coming on stage)
 Crows Fly Black
 Traitor
 Pyre of Gods
 Wings of Darkness
 Back in the Fire
 Tides
 Bleeding Dust
 Veteran of the Psychic Wars (Blue Öyster Cult cover)
 Angels of Pain
 Warhead
 Follow Me Into Madness
 Before the Skies Come Down
 Ashes to the Stars
 Undead Son
 You
 Crawlspace
 Guitar solo
 Rider of the Last Day
 I Rule

CD 
Crows Fly Back
 Traitor
 Pyre of Gods
 Tides
 Bleeding Dust
 Angels Of Pain
 Follow Me Into Madness
 Before the Skies Come Down
 Ashes to the Stars
 Undead Son
 You
 Crawlspace
 Rider of the Last Day
 I Rule

2 DVD Version

Track listing (DVD 1) 
 Crows Fly Black
 Traitor
 Pyre of Gods
 Wings of Darkness
 Back in the Fire
 Tides
 Bleeding Dust
 Veteran of the Psychic Wars (Blue Öyster Cult cover)
 Angels of Pain
 Warhead
 Follow Me Into Madness
 Before the Skies Come Down
 Ashes to the Stars
 Undead Son
 You
 Crawlspace
 Guitar solo
 Rider of the Last Day
 I Rule

Bonus material (DVD 2) 
 Marko & Zac Interview
 Stigmata Archives
 21st Century Live Scenes
 Pyre Of Gods (promotional video)
 Ashes To The Stars (promotional video)

2 CD version

Track listing (CD 1) 
 Crows Fly Black
 Traitor
 Pyre of Gods
 Wings of Darkness
 Back in the Fire
 Tides
 Bleeding Dust
 Veteran of Psychic Wars
 Angels of Pain
 Warhead

Track listing (CD 2) 
 Follow Me Into Madness
 Before the Skies Come Down
 Ashes to the Stars
 Undead Son
 You
 Crawlspace
 Rider of the Last Day
 I Rule
 Guardian Angel (bonus track)
 Things That Crawl at Night (bonus track)

The last two tracks were recorded at a separate performance on 6 January 2008.

Performers 
 Marko Hietala – vocals, bass
 Zachary Hietala – guitar
 Janne Tolsa – keyboard
 Pecu Cinnari – drums
 Tommi "Tuple" Salmela – sampler, vocals

Charts

References

External links 
 Tarot official website

Tarot (band) video albums
Live video albums
2008 live albums
2008 video albums